Emily Alves da Cunha Lima (born 29 September 1980) is a football manager and former player. During her playing career, she operated as a midfielder for clubs in Brazil, Spain and Italy, and has represented Portugal internationally. In 2016, she became the first female manager to coach the Brazil women's national team.

Club career
Lima began her football career when she was 14 years old, on Saad Esporte Clube. In Brazil she also played as a midfielder for São Paulo FC from 1997 to 2000, Palestra de São Bernardo, Barra de Teresópolis (2001) and Veranópolis (2002). Lima had also played for the Brazilian national under-17 women's football team.

In 2003 Lima moved to Spain, playing for the clubs Estudiantes de Huelva, Puebla de la Calzada, Prainsa de Zaragoza and L’Estartit. She finished her playing career in 2010, at the Italian club Napoli CF.

International career
Born in Brazil, Lima has never played for clubs in Portugal, but she is of Portuguese descent, which allowed her to attain dual citizenship and play for the Portugal women's national team, making her debut in 2007.

Managerial career
Back to Brazil, Lima pursued a coaching career. She became coaching assistant for Portuguesa de Desportos  in 2010. She became the titular coach of CA Juventus  until 2013, when she was invited to manage the Brazilian under-17 team. In 2015, she coached São José Esporte Clube, the last Copa Libertadores Femenina champion. She led the club to the second place at  2015 Copa do Brasil.

In 2016, Lima was appointed as coach of the Brazilian women's national team, in the place of Vadão, thus becoming the first women to coach the Seleção Feminina. Lima's first competition as national coach was the Torneio Internacional de Manaus, on which she led the team to their seventh title. She was fired of the Brazilian team in September 2017; under her run, the Seleção won seven games, lost five and drew one.

In 2019 assume Ecuador.

References

External links 
 
 Profile at Football.it 

1980 births
Living people
Footballers from São Paulo
Brazilian women's footballers
Portuguese women's footballers
Portuguese football managers
Female association football managers
Women's association football managers
Portugal women's international footballers
São Paulo FC players
Brazilian expatriate women's footballers
Brazilian people of Portuguese descent
Citizens of Portugal through descent
Portuguese expatriate women's footballers
Portuguese expatriate sportspeople in Spain
Expatriate women's footballers in Spain
Portuguese expatriate sportspeople in Italy
Expatriate women's footballers in Italy
Clube Atlético Juventus managers
Brazil women's national football team managers
Saad Esporte Clube (women) players
Women's association football midfielders
Primera División (women) players
Zaragoza CFF players
UE L'Estartit players
Santos FC (women) managers
Ecuador women's national football team managers
São Paulo FC (women) players
S.S.D. Napoli Femminile players
Portuguese expatriate football managers
Portuguese expatriate sportspeople in Ecuador
Expatriate football managers in Ecuador
Brazilian expatriate sportspeople in Ecuador
Brazilian expatriate sportspeople in Italy
Brazilian expatriate sportspeople in Spain
Brazilian expatriate football managers
Brazilian football managers
Lesbian sportswomen
LGBT association football players
Brazilian LGBT sportspeople
Portuguese LGBT sportspeople
Brazilian lesbians
Portuguese lesbians